Olvassuo Strict Nature Reserve (Olvassuon luonnonpuisto) encompasses  in the Northern Ostrobothnia and Kainuu regions of Finland. It is situated inside a larger,  protected area.

The reserve is part of Natura 2000 and Ramsar programmes.

References

Strict nature reserves of Finland
Geography of North Ostrobothnia
Geography of Kainuu
Puolanka
Natura 2000 in Finland
Ramsar sites in Finland
Utajärvi
Pudasjärvi